The Repealing and Amending (Second) Act, 2015 is an Act of the Parliament of India that repealed 90 obsolete Acts, and also amended the provisions of the Railways (Amendment) Act, 2008 and the Indian Maritime University Act, 2008 to correct typographical errors. The Act was the second such repealing act tabled by the Narendra Modi administration aimed at repealing obsolete laws.

Background and legislative history
Prime Minister Narendra Modi advocated the repeal of old laws during his 2014 general election campaign. At the 2015 Economic Times Global Business Summit, Modi stated, "Our country suffers from an excess of old and unnecessary laws which obstruct people and businesses. We began the exercise of identifying unnecessary laws and repealing them. 1,877 Central laws have been identified for repeal."

The Repealing and Amending (Second) Bill, 2014 was introduced in the Lok Sabha on 3 December 2014 by the Minister of Law and Justice, D.V. Sadananda Gowda. The bill sought to repeal 90 Acts and pass amendments to two Acts. The bill sought to completely repeal 88 Acts. The remaining two were amending acts whose changes had been incorporated into the existing Acts. The bill also sought to amend provisions of the Railways (Amendment) Act, 2008 and the Indian Maritime University Act, 2008 so as to correct typographical errors.

The bill was referred to a Select Committee on 23 December 2014. The Committee submitted its report on the bill on 24 February 2015. The report recommended that the bill be passed, and also suggested adding an "automatic repeal clause" to the Railway Appropriation and Finance Appropriation Acts, as these Acts were only required to be in effect for the duration of one year. The Committee suggested adding similar clauses in other pending Bills as well, and recommended that the Law Ministry consider amending Section 6A of the General Clauses Act, 1897(related to the effect of repeals) to enable the inclusion of an automatic repeal clause in Bills. The Committee further noted that a review and repeal of obsolete laws should be carried out every 5 years.

The bill, as recommended by the Select Committee, was passed by the Lok Sabha on 8 December 2014 and by the Rajya Sabha on 5 May 2015. The bill received assent from President Pranab Mukherjee on 14 May, and was notified in The Gazette of India on 9 May 2015.

Repealed Acts
Of the 90 acts included in the bill's First Schedule, 88 were completely repealed and two were partially repealed.

See also 
 List of legislations repealed under Modi government

References

Acts of the Parliament of India 2015
Repealed Indian legislation